Hugh Reid Miller (May 14, 1812July 19, 1863) was an American politician who served as a member of the Mississippi House of Representatives from 1842 to 1844. Miller was mortally wounded at the Battle of Gettysburg on the third day while in temporary command of Davis' Brigade.

See also  
 List of University of South Carolina people

Notes

References

External links 

 
 Miller Family Papers at the Mississippi Department of Archives and History
 Miller Family Papers at the University of Mississippi

1812 births
1863 deaths
19th-century American judges
19th-century American landowners
19th-century American lawyers
19th-century American politicians
American Civil War prisoners of war
American lawyers admitted to the practice of law by reading law
American slave owners
Burials in Mississippi
Colonels (military rank)
Confederate States Army officers
Deaths by firearm in Pennsylvania
Farmers from Mississippi
Members of the Mississippi House of Representatives
Military personnel from Mississippi
Mississippi circuit court judges
Mississippi lawyers
Mississippi Whigs
People from Abbeville County, South Carolina
People from Pontotoc County, Mississippi
People of Mississippi in the American Civil War
University of South Carolina alumni
Confederate States of America military personnel killed in the American Civil War